Tonk Lok Sabha constituency was a Lok Sabha (parliamentary) constituency in Rajasthan state in India. It was abolished following the delimitation of parliamentary constituencies in 2008.

Members of Parliament
1952: Manikya Lal Varma, Indian National Congress
1957: Heera Lal Shastri, Indian National Congress
1962: Jamnalal Bairwa, Swatantra Party
1967: Jamnalal Bairwa, Swatantra Party
1971: Ram Kanwar Bairwa, Swatantra Party
1977: Ram Kanwar Bairwa, Janata Party
1980: Banwari Lal Bairwa, Indian National Congress
1984: Banwari Lal Bairwa, Indian National Congress
1989: Gopal Pacherwal, Janata Dal
1991: Ram Narain Bairwa, Bharatiya Janata Party
1996: Shyam Lal Bansiwal, Bharatiya Janata Party
1998: Dowaraka Prasad Bairwa, Indian National Congress
1999: Shyam Lal Bansiwal, Bharatiya Janata Party
2001: Kailash Meghwal, Bharatiya Janata Party (By-elections)
2004: Kailash Meghwal, Bharatiya Janata Party

Election results

See also
 List of former constituencies of the Lok Sabha
 Tonk district
 Tonk-Sawai Madhopur (Lok Sabha constituency)

References

Tonk district
Former Lok Sabha constituencies of Rajasthan
Former constituencies of the Lok Sabha
2008 disestablishments in India
Constituencies disestablished in 2008